Arkham Tales: Legends of the Haunted City is a 2006 Cthulhu Mythos anthology published by Chaosium. It is a shared universe anthology, meaning all the stories occur in the same fictional universe. The stories all take place in the fictional city of Arkham, Massachusetts, spanning a time period from 1873 to the present day. The stories all feature elements of the Cthulhu Mythos. The anthology is edited by William Jones.

Contents
 "Mysterious Dan's Legacy" by Matthew Baugh
 "Vaughn's Diary" by Robert Vaughn
 "The Orb" by Tony Campbell
 "The Nether Collection" by Cody Goodfellow
 "Worms" by Pat Harrigan
 "They Thrive in Darkness" by Ron Shiflet
 "What Sorrows May Come" by Lee Clark Zumpe
 "Arkham Pets" by James Ambuehl
 "Small Ghost" by Michael Minnis
 "Burnt Tea" by Michael Dziesinski
 "Arkham Rain" by John Goodrich  (YBF&H Honorable Mention)
 "Regrowth" by David Conyers
 "The Idea of Fear" by C.J. Henderson  (YBF&H Honorable Mention)
 "Disconnected" by Brian M. Sammons  (YBF&H Honorable Mention)
 "The Lady in the Grove" by Scott Lette
 "On Leave to Arkham" by Bill Bilstad
 "Geometry of the Soul" by Jason Andrew

References

Cthulhu Mythos anthologies
2006 anthologies